The 2005 GMAC Bowl was an American college football bowl game. It was part of the 2005 NCAA Division I-A football season, and was the 8th edition. It was played in December 2005, and featured the UTEP Miners, and the Toledo Rockets.

Scoring summary
Toledo scored first on a 10-yard touchdown pass from quarterback Bruce Gradkowski to wide receiver John Allen. Reagan Schneider of UTEP kicked a 34-yard field goal at the end of the first quarter to make the lead 7-3. In the second quarter, Gradkowski threw a 33-yard touchdown pass to David Washington Jr. to make the lead 14-3 Toledo. With 5:46 in the half, quarterback Jordan Palmer found wide receiver Johnnie Lee Higgins for an 18-yard touchdown pass. The extra point made the score 14-10 Toledo.

With 2:56 left in the half, Schneider drilled a 23-yard field goal to cut the lead to 14-13. With 1:13 left, Gradkoski found Steve Odom for a 31-yard touchdown pass that extended the lead to 21-13. With only 10 seconds left in the half, Palmer threw an interception to David Thomas that was returned 37 yards for a Toledo touchdown. Toledo led 28-13 at the half. In the third quarter, Jason Robbins kicked a 29-yard field goal to give Toledo a 31-13 lead. Touchdown passes to Josh Powell and Chris Hopkins gave Toledo a 45-13 win.

Statistics

Point shaving

In 2007, members of the Toledo football team were charged with participating in a point shaving scandal. Members of the football team were connected with Detroit-area gamblers and were paid to intentionally affect the final score so that certain point spreads were covered. The 2005 GMAC Bowl was mentioned as a game that was affected.

In 2011, Toledo running back Quinton Broussard pleaded guilty in connection with the point scandal. In the plea, Broussard admitted to receiving $500 for intentionally losing a fumble in the first half, when Toledo held a small lead.

References

External links
 USA Today summary
 ESPN summary

Gmac Bowl
LendingTree Bowl
UTEP Miners football bowl games
Toledo Rockets football bowl games
GMAC Bowl